Michael Thorpe (born March 12, 1944) is an English-American physicist and Foundation Professor of Physics at Arizona State University.  He received his D. Phil from Oxford University in 1968  in condensed matter physics under supervision of Sir Roger James Elliott.  His early research was on network glasses, but has recently focused on applying his knowledge to the study of protein dynamics.

In 2003, Thorpe joined Arizona State University from Michigan State University. His research interests are in the theory of disordered systems, with a special emphasis on properties that are determined by geometry and topology. He has a research background in condensed matter theory, and in recent years has developed the mathematical theory of flexibility and mobility for use in network glasses.

Birth and education 
Thorpe attended Manchester University in 1962 and received his B.Sc. with first Class Honours in Theoretical Physics in 1965. After conducting research in theoretical solid state physics (1965–1968), he received his D. Phil from Department of Theoretical Physics at Oxford University. He was a research associate at Brookhaven National Laboratory from 1968 to 1970.

He joined Department of Engineering & Applied Science at Yale University as an assistant professor in 1970, where he became an associate professor from 1974 to 1977. He was an associate professor (1976–1980), professor (1980–1996) and university distinguished professor (1997–2003) at Physics & Astronomy Department in Michigan State University.

In 2003, Thorpe joined Arizona State University as foundation professor and later became the founding director of the Center for Biological Physics.

Research 
Thorpe's work has connected two fundamental subjects in the topology and properties of compacted networks.  His work on network glasses demonstrated that their quenched character can be described quantitatively in terms of their internal stress, a nonlocal quantity whose reduction optimizes glass properties.  His early work  laid some of the foundations for Corning's revolutionary Gorilla glass, the first qualitative improvement in glass in more than a century.   His most recent work has been in biological physics. The flexible regions in proteins and protein complexes are determined from the x-ray structure as determined crystallographically. These are used to determine dynamical pathways between different protein conformations using Monte Carlo methods. Proteins are stable enough to maintain a three-dimensional structure, but flexible enough for biological function. The aim of this research work is to find underlying principles and unifying concepts, to better understand the evolution and function of proteins and protein complexes.

Recent publications

Videos 
 Simulating a mutation in a protein

References

External links
Michael Thorpe homepage
 Michael Thorpe Google scholar profile

British materials scientists
Living people
Alumni of the University of Oxford
Michigan State University faculty
Arizona State University faculty
British emigrants to the United States
1944 births